The Yellow Thing is a double-hulled floating vessel (like a catamaran), used by Greenpeace to sample marine debris. As of 2006, its primary mission is to be used as a trawl for plastic samples in areas such as the Mediterranean Sea and the North Pacific Gyre. It is not self-powered, rather it is towed via a ship-attached boom (as of 3-2006, it was being used on the MV Esperanza). It is also considered to be relatively stable as a marine vehicle.

References
"What is the Yellow Thing?"
Reuters report on Greenpeace trawling study

Individual catamarans
Ships of Greenpeace